Zé Roberto (born 1974), full name José Roberto da Silva Júnior, is a Brazilian football left-back and midfielder

Zé Roberto is also a Portuguese nickname for the name José Robert. Zé Roberto may also refer to:

 Zé Roberto (footballer, born 1945), full name José Roberto Marques, Brazilian football forward
 Zé Roberto (volleyball) (born 1954), full name José Roberto Guimarães, Brazilian volleyball coach and former player
 Zé Roberto (footballer, born 1978), full name José Roberto Gomes Santana, Brazilian football midfielder
 Zé Roberto (footballer, born 1980), full name José Roberto de Oliveira, Brazilian football attacking midfielder
 Zé Roberto (footballer, born 1993), full name José Roberto Assunção de Araújo Filho, Brazilian football forward

See also 
 
 Roberto (disambiguation)